The June 5th 1993 attack on Pakistanis was a major confrontation that occurred concurrently in different parts of the Somali capital of Mogadishu, between Somali citizens & militias against the Pakistani peacekeeping contingent of UNOSOM II. The event marked a seminal moment for the United Nations operation in Somalia. It was the deadliest loss of UN peacekeepers since the Congo in 1961 and would consequently lead to UNOSOM II being primarily characterized by the hunt for General Mohammed Farah Aidid. This would result in an escalating cycle of violence which led to the 13 June 1993 killings of Somali protestors by Pakistani troops, the 12 July 1993 Bloody Monday raid and 3-4 October 1993 Battle of Mogadishu.

Background and rationale for inspection 
An agreement had been previously signed between the warring Somali factions and UNOSOM to store heavy weaponry in "Authorized Weapons Storage Sites" (AWSS), which would be subject to UN inspections. June 5th, 1993, would be the first inspection of the AWSS.

On the afternoon of Friday June 4th, the day before the battle, UNOSOM notified General Aidid's headquarters that they were planning to inspect six of his arms storage sites. Notably only Aidid's faction, the Somali National Alliance (SNA) was to be inspected. The warning of the coming inspection was received by Aidid's lieutenant Abdi "Qeybdiib" Hassan Awale, as Aidid himself was not present to receive the warning with Friday being the Muslim day of Sabbath, and consequently he was off work. Awale would protest that he was not authorized to accept such a notification, a claim which UNOSOM representatives rejected, and informed him that he was a recognized high official of the S.N.A/USC. The visit was now considered as an official notification. Abdi "Qeybdiib" would warn the UNOSOM envoys, "This is unacceptable, this means war." 

This perceived slight greatly played into Aidid's growing fear that UNOSOM was attempting marginalize his authority in their effort to recreate the Somali state. A 1994 UN Commission of Inquiry would conclude that the conflict had been set in motion by the decision to give Aidid the "ultimatum like" search notice.

The Pakistani commander cautioned American General Thomas Montgomery that the inspections would be highly politically sensitive and dangerous. Montgomery did not tell the Pakistanis about Abdi "Qeybdiibs" warning and the Pakistanis' claim if they had known about the objection they would have arrived better equipped.

Radio Mogadishu 
One of the AWSS was located at Radio Mogadishu, an immensely popular broadcasting station controlled by the SNA. It had in recent weeks begun airing anti American and anti UNOSOM propaganda condemning interference in Somali politics after UN envoy Admiral Johnathan Howe had rejected the May peace conference Aidid had set up. On the airwaves Aidid would publicly accuse UNOSOM II of "colonialization" and "imperialist designs". The broadcasts greatly incensed UNOSOM officials and a significant debate occurred over how best to deal with the station.

On May 31, 1993, Aidids political rivals met with Johnathan Howe and attempted to convince him to take over Radio Mogadishu, a meeting Aidid was made well aware of. Rumor quickly began spreading across the city that the UNOSOM had actually resolved to shut down Radio Mogadishu entirely, which further angered Aidid, rumors that were corroborated after the fact by the US special envoy to Somalia, Robert B. Oakley. 

Aidid saw this action specifically as unfair as his main political rival, Ali Mahdi, also had a radio station that UNOSOM was not threatening, on account of Mahdi's claim that it was private.

The attack 
That particulars of what occurred, and who exactly initiated the battle is contested by UNOSOM and Somali accounts.

On the morning of Saturday June 5th 1993 an element of the Pakistani force in Somalia had been tasked with the inspection of site AWSS 5, which happened to be located at Aidid controlled Radio Mogadishu. The station was popular across the city, even among those who did not like Aidid or the Habr Gidr clan and concern that UNOSOM was coming to shut it down infuriated many citizens of Mogadishu. American special forces technicians had also been sent along with the Pakistanis in order to best determine how to best disable the station.

According to the 1994 United Nations Inquiry into the events leading up to the Battle of Mogadishu:"Opinions differ, even among UNOSOM officials, on whether the weapons inspections of 5 June 1993 was genuine or was merely a cover-up for reconnaissance and subsequent seizure of Radio Mogadishu"As the Pakistanis entered the station a huge crowd of Somalis gathered in protest and began throwing stones yelling, "Go home UNOSOM! Go home!" and in response Pakistani peacekeepers opened fire into the air to ward off the growing angry mob. At 10 am when the inspections almost completed, fighting broke out in five different locations in the surrounding area. At Radio Mogadishu, the Pakistanis quickly ran out of ammo and had to fend off grenade attacks using wooden planks as bats.

The largest fight of the battle occurred about a mile from the stadium where the roughly 4,000 Pakistani troops in Mogadishu were stationed. Approximately 100 of them were driving back from the weapons inspections when they stopped to remove a roadblock and were ambushed by Somali militia. According to General Ikram that attackers were on both sides of the road, battling for two and a half hours with the Pakistanis, using heavy machine guns, rocket-propelled grenades and rocket launchers. Italian forces were called for help, but the dispatched helicopter would end up wounding three of the Pakistanis and armor support took hours to arrive.

The fighting resulted in the death of 25 Pakistani soldiers and 16 to 35 Somalis according to hospital figures. 59 Pakistanis and 3 Americans were wounded. Aidid disputed the hospital figures, claiming 70 Somalis had been killed.

The severity of the Pakistani death toll is attributed to the lack of armored cars, as many of those killed were shot as they tried to leave their cars to take cover in nearby houses and behind walls.

According to the UN 
At Radio Mogadishu, UN officials claimed that certain individuals had begun to incite the crowd and snipers opened fire. They further claim that two of the initial incidents of shooting were just a diversionary tactic to draw out peacekeeping troops.

The Pakistanis would deny the Somali charge that they were attempting to seize Radio Mogadishu.

UN accounts claim that militia mixed into the crowd had opened fire on the peacekeepers and initiated the battle at Radio Mogadishu.

According to Mohammed Farah Aidid and Somalis 
Somali accounts claim that the Pakistanis at Radio Mogadishu had opened fire on the crowd first, initiating the battle."Then the soldiers lowered the muzzles of their guns and shot straight at people. I saw a young child of four and a girl about fifteen and a boy had been killed. I had not used my gun since the night at Villa Somalia (the night Somali dictator Siad Barre was driven from Mogadishu in 1991). I did not fight in the civil war, but now I ran to dig it up from where it was hidden."

Account of the incident at Radio Mogadishu according to a young Somali named Abdiwele Ali in an interview with Mark Maren Somalis would claim that the inspection was actually a veiled attempt to shut down the station, and Resolution 837, passed the next day, fed into this narrative as it urged UN forces to, "...neutralize radio broadcasting systems that contribute to the violence and attacks directed against UNOSOM II".

Aidid called for an independent investigation of the incident and claimed that the United Nations was not impartial and had a serious conflict of interest in judging an assault on its own forces. A UN inquiry would conclude the next year that: "Without investigation, blame for the attacks of 5 June was laid on the "USC/SNA."

Immediate reaction and ramifications

Somali reaction 
At 7 pm on the same day of the clash, Aidid would take to the airwaves and call on residents of Mogadishu to be calm and not shoot at UNOSOM forces unless they fired upon them first. He would directly accuse UNOSOM of attempting to take over the station and sabotaging grassroots Somali peace initiatives."Today we pray to Allah for those who died today, may Allah have mercy on them and to those who were wounded may they have a speedy recovery...they (UNOSOM leadership) are directly responsible for the events that happened today. God is my witness...I ask the Somali people to observe order."

Excerpt of Mohammed Farah Aidid's broadcast on the evening of June 5, 1993, to the citizens of Mogadishu.

Pakistani reaction 
In Pakistan, Qazi Hussain Ahmed, head of the party Jamiat Islami would call for the total withdrawal of Pakistani troops following the attack, saying they were "only serving the interests of US imperialism in Somalia and its neighboring Muslim country, Sudan".

June 1993 killings of Somali protestors 

On Sunday, 13 June 1993, an element of the Pakistani contingent of UNOSOM II opened fire with a machine gun onto a crowd of Somali protestors in Mogadishu for at least one full minute, killing at least 14 Somalis, including women and children, and wounding more than 50 others.

On the following day 14 June, Doctors Without Borders responded to the killings with press release denouncing the excessive use of force by UNOSOM II troops.

A few days after the shooting, US President Bill Clinton held a news conference in which he heavily criticized Aidid for his killing of UNOSOM soldiers, but made no condemnation of the killings of Somali civilians at the hands of U.N. forces.

Resolution 837 
The following day on June 6, 1993, the UN Security Council passed Resolution 837, calling for the arrest and prosecution of the persons responsible for the death and wounding of the peacekeepers. The Pakistanis, who had proposed the resolution, originally directly named Aidid in it, but was removed by the Americans and others who cited inadequate evidence.

During private UNSC consultations, Russia proposed creating an international tribunal to try people who attacked UN personnel. Russian Ambassador Yuli Vorontsov would argue the attackers should be punished through legal or military mean.

Adm. Jonathan Howe, the United Nations envoy to Somalia, would announce on UN radio that a full investigation would be made into the affair, and appropriate steps taken against those responsible. It was soon after this that he put out the infamous $25,000 bounty on Aidid's head. The S.N.A would counter with a $1,000,000 bounty on Howe.

The UNOSOM II offensive against Aidid begins 
Following the passing of Resolution 837 UNOSOM II forces would begin making offensive strikes all over Mogadishu with AC-130 gunships and helicopters. On advice from the UN, all aid work in the city came to a swift halt as the military campaign against Aidid began. The UN would proceed to officially deal Aidid out of the Somali nation-building process. Following the attack on the Pakistanis, Johnathan Howe would begin to push Washington for more help in arresting Aidid, as he convinced that apprehending him, followed by trying him as a war criminal and removing Aidid from Somalia - would help abate the raging civil war. 

UNOSOM would begin to greatly increase its firepower in Mogadishu and started making deliberate shows of force with Italian and American helicopters over the city. The American Quick Reaction Force, after having been split up into several different hot spots in Somalia, was entirely recalled to Mogadishu. On the 17th of June, Aidid's compound would be directly targeted by AC-130 gunships in retaliation and Radio Mogadishu itself would also be destroyed. 

Howe had also requested the deployment of Delta Force that June following the clash, but was rejected by President Clinton. Howe had envisioned the small, secret Army unit dispatch small groups of well-trained soldiers who could mount a bloodless arrest of Aidid. Despite Clintons rejection, Delta began training for the operation early in the summer and commanders dispatched an assessment team to Somalia in June. They reported that Aidid could easily be grabbed off the street. Clinton would finally agree to Howes request following the deliberate killings of US troops in August 1993.

References

United Nations operations in Somalia
Pakistan military presence in other countries
Pakistan–Somalia relations
Conflicts in 1993
Somali Civil War
1993 in Somalia